Charkhestaneh (also Romanized as Charkhestāneh; also known as Chār Sāna, Chār Sūna, and Chowkhestāneh) is a village in Beyranvand-e Jonubi Rural District, Bayravand District, Khorramabad County, Lorestan Province, Iran. At the 2006 census, its population was 117, in 30 families.

References 

Towns and villages in Khorramabad County